Following is a list of senators of Somme, people who have represented the department of Somme in the Senate of France.

Third Republic

Senators for the Somme under the French Third Republic were:

 Charles de Dompierre d'Hornoy (1876–1882)
 Marie-Joseph Vaysse de Rainneville (1876–1882)
 Albert Dauphin (1876–1898)
 Henri Labitte (1882–1885)
 Victor Magniez (1882–1890)
 Frédéric Petit (1886–1895)
 Gustave-Louis Jametel (1890–1893)
 Achille Bernot (1893–1909)
 Louis Froment (1895–1909)
 Alfred Maquennehen (1899–1900) and 1909–1915
 Paul Tellier (1900–1904)
 Henri Raquet (1901–1909)
 Gustave Trannoy (1905–1907)
 Ernest Cauvin (1907–1922)
 Alphonse Fiquet (1909–1916)
 Albert Rousé (1909–1920)
 René Gouge (1920–1925)
 Paul Thuillier-Buridard (1920–1926)
 Amédée Pierrin (1920–1936)
 Anatole Jovelet (1923–1940)
 Louis-Lucien Klotz (1925–1928)
 Edmond Cavillon (1926–1936)
 Henry Bourdeaux (1929–1940)
 Gérard de Berny (1936–1940)
 Joseph Harent (1936–1940)

Fourth Republic

Senators for the Somme under the French Fourth Republic were:

Fifth Republic 
Senators for the Somme under the French Fifth Republic were:

References

Sources

 
Somme